USS Richard G. Lugar (DDG-136) is a planned  guided missile destroyer of the United States Navy, the 86th overall for the class. She will be named in honor of Richard G. Lugar, a Republican United States Senator who represented Indiana. He served in the United States Navy from 1957 to 1960 and achieved the rank of Lieutenant Junior Grade. She was officially named by Secretary of the Navy Richard V. Spencer during a ceremony 18 November 2019 at the Indiana War Memorial in Indianapolis.

References 

 

Arleigh Burke-class destroyers
Proposed ships of the United States Navy